Shadoxhurst is a civil parish and a village on the remnant forest the Kent Weald, near Ashford in Kent, England between the Greensand Ridge and Romney Marsh.

Geography
Part of the vestige of county-sized woodland known as The Weald, Shadoxhurst is mostly wooded countryside and farmland. with the Whitewater Dyke (a tributary of the River Stour) rising in the area.

Shadoxhurst is on the Woodchurch to Ashford road.

The village is known as 'the woodland gateway to the countryside'  and is surrounded by ancient woodlands.

The area ranges between approximately 40 and 50 metres above sea level.

History
A fairly comprehensive historical overview in Edward Hasted's History and Topography of Kent covers, for instance, the church and the village as well as the recorded history up to the end of the 18th century.

Reverend Charles Rolfe (1800-1877), who worked as the rector of Shadoxhurst's St Peter and Paul Church for thirty-nine years was directly descended from John Rolfe of Heacham who married Chief Powhatan's daughter, Pocahontas on April 5, 1614 in Jamestown, Virginia.

Amenities
The village has a Church of England-used 13th-century church with lancet windows, to Saints Peter and Paul.

References

External links

Statistical civil parish overview - map

Villages in Kent
Villages in the Borough of Ashford
Civil parishes in Ashford, Kent